The Taedonggang Battery Factory(), located in Saemaŭl-dong, P'yŏngch'ŏn-guyŏk, P'yŏngyang, North Korea, is a factory producing batteries for vehicles and power plants. It is served by rail via the P'yŏngnam Line of the Korean State Railway. It was built in 1975 with Soviet aid, becoming operational in 1982 and subsequently expanded in 1987.

References

Manufacturing companies of North Korea
Soviet foreign aid
Korea–Soviet Union relations